Dzhalka (Ƶalq) is a rural locality (a selo) in Gudermessky District, Chechnya.

Administrative and municipal status 
Municipally, Dzhalka is incorporated as Dzhalkinskoye rural settlement. It is the administrative center of the municipality and is the only settlement included in it.

Geography 

Dzhalka is located on the right bank of the Argun River.

The nearest settlements to Dzhalka are Basa-Gala in the north-west, the city of Gudermes in the north-east, Novy Engenoy in the south-east, Tsotsi-Yurt in the south, and Mesker-Yurt in the south-west.

History 
In 1944, after the genocide and deportation of the Chechen and Ingush people and the Chechen-Ingush ASSR was abolished, the village of Dzhalka was renamed, and was settled by people from other ethnic groups. From 1944 to 1957, it was a part of Grozny Oblast.

In 1957, when the Vaynakh people returned and the Chechen-Ingush ASSR was restored, the village regained its old name, Dzhalka.

Population 
 1990 Census: 3,104
 2002 Census: 6,292
 2010 Census: 7,415
 2020 estimate: 8,972

According to the results of the 2010 Census, the majority of residents of Dzhalka (7,408 or 99,90%) were ethnic Chechens.

Teips 
Members of the following teips live in Dzhalka:
 Aitkalloy
 Allaroy
 Benoy
 Chermoy
 Gordaloy
 Kurchaloy
 Shirdy
 Zandakoy

Education 
The village of Dzhalka hosts two secondary schools.

References 

Rural localities in Gudermessky District